Thliptoceras caradjai is a moth in the family Crambidae. It was described by Eugene G. Munroe and Akira Mutuura in 1968. It is found in China in Jiangsu, Zhejiang, Fujian, Jiangxi, Guangdong, Guangxi, Hainan and Guizhou.

The wingspan is about 20–22 mm. The ground colour of the wings is yellow, with a sinuate antemedial line and a fine postmedial line on the forewings.

References

Moths described in 1968
Pyraustinae